The Geely Binyue is a subcompact crossover SUV produced by Chinese auto manufacturer Geely since 22 August 2018. It is sold in international markets as the Geely Coolray.


First generation

The first generation Binyue was named "SX11" under development and was revealed in August 2018 as the Binyue. The Geely Binyue was positioned between the Geely Emgrand GS and the Geely Boyue within Geely's crossover portfolio, and is the first crossover based on the BMA platform. The Binyue 260T Sport Versions carry two unique "Geely Sport" logos, which are different from the former Earth Logo.

Binyue PHEV
The Binyue PHEV is the plug-in hybrid version of the standard Binyue.

2021 sports appearance package
A sports appearance package was added for the 2021 model year and launced in August 2021, featuring restyled front bumper and aero kit with a roof spoiler. The interior remains largely the same as previous model years and powertrain remains the same as the regular model.

Markets

Malaysia

The Binyue was released as the Proton X50 in Malaysia in September 2020. It is locally assembled by Proton's facility in Tanjung Malim as their second SUV model and the second Geely-based model after the X70.

Philippines
In the Philippines, the Binyue is sold as the Coolray. It was launched in 25 September 2019 and marks Geely's return to the Philippine market. Later on in 2022, Geely launched the Coolray GT Limited Edition in the Philippines.

Belarus
In Belarus, the Coolray was launched on 12 February 2020. It is assembled by BelGee, a joint-venture between Geely and BelAZ.

Russia
The Coolray was launched in Russia on February 27, 2020.

Safety
Level 2 automated driving system with Intelligent Cruise Control with follow traffic up to  plus change lanes autonomously and Automated Parking assist.

Sales

Binyue Cool

A major updated version of the Binyue was launched in 2022 as the Binyue Cool, featuring redesigns all over the vehicle excluding the door panels and rear fenders. The updated model features Geely’s Vision Starburst design language and the updated front and rear end designs adds  to the vehicle length. 

Its  acceleration time is 7.6 seconds.

References

External links

Binyue
Cars introduced in 2018
2020s cars
Mini sport utility vehicles
Crossover sport utility vehicles
Front-wheel-drive vehicles
All-wheel-drive vehicles
Cars of China